The Death of Romance is the fifth album by Norwegian industrial rock quintet Zeromancer. Released just a year after their previous album Sinners International, the electronic sounds prevail on this album rather than the heavy guitar sounding of Sinners. It is their second album released through the Trisol Music Group.

A video for the track "Industrypeople" was shot.

Track listing
 "2.6.25"
 "Industrypeople"
 "The Hate Alphabet"
 "The Death of Romance"
 "The Pygmalion Effect"
 "Murder Sound"
 "Revengefuck"
 "Virgin Ring"
 "The Plinth"
 "Mint"
 "V"

2010 albums
Zeromancer albums